Balboa Yacht Club (BYC) is a yacht club located in Corona del Mar, Newport Beach, Orange County, California. It is located near the entrance of the Newport Harbor.

History
BYC was founded in 1922 as the Southland Sailing Club, and was soon renamed to the Balboa Yacht Club. BYC has an outstation on Catalina Island, in Whites Cove, west of Avalon.

Facilities

The facility has a main dining room and outdoor seating, and a pavilion equipped with a barbecue and snack bar. It provides mooring cans, plus both wet and dry boat slips for members and guests for a monthly fee. The wet slips can accommodate boats up to 55 feet in length, and dry slips and a three-ton crane for smaller boats up to 25 feet in length as well as a dinghy launch and storage. The club is open five days a week, plus a full-time dock staff and shore boat.

There is also a satellite facility located at Whites Landing on Santa Catalina Island. This location offers members a small anchorage and a wonderful beach to stay at while boating about the island. There are a few tents available for those on vessels not suited to sleeping, and a large communal grill is lit in the evening for cooking. There are kayaks available for use, as well as a volleyball court.

Fleets

Balboa Yacht Club is home to multiple fleets, many of which race regularly.  There are fleets of Naples Sabot, FJs, Harbor 20s, and an adult Sabot fleet.  Most of the larger boats race outside of Newport Harbor in the Pacific Ocean. It is the home of the Thursday night "Beer Can Races".

Sailors
Balboa's skippers Bob White and Bob Davis won the Snipe world championships in 1945 and 1946 respectively, and Jack Franco and Renee Vesterby the North Americans in 1990. David Ullman won the 470 World Championships in 1977, 1978 and 1980, the Melges 24 World Championships in 2007 and the Clifford Day Mallory Cup in 1980.

Junior Sailing Program
The club has a large junior sailing programs which includes a full-time junior program director, coaches, maintenance and administrative staff. Facilities include a junior clubhouse, tool room, Sabot and Laser storage spaces, sail and boat wash areas crane and launching ramp.

Members have access to the junior charter fleet that includes Sabots, Lasers, CFJ's & C420's. Also included in the fleet are the BYC Jr. race committee boat, Whaler chase boats, inflatables, and multi-boat trailers for travel to away regattas.

Throughout the year, events are scheduled for sailors of all ability levels including special events, field trips, racing clinics, a very active after-school program, and practices. During the summer months, the Junior Program offers summer sailing and racing program.

Regattas

The Balboa Yacht Club is the home of many national and international regattas each year, featuring some of the most predominate racing yachts in the Southern California area.

Annual CDM to Cabo San Lucas race
Annual Governor's Cup
Thursday Night Beer Can Races
2012 FJ National Championships

Governor's Cup
The Governor's Cup is a youth match racing sailing regatta held annually by the Balboa Yacht Club.

The regatta was established in 1967 when the then California Governor Ronald Reagan donated the cup to Chet and Glee Purcell. Reagan declared the cup be "for the purpose of encouraging Youth Racing in the State of California and the recognition of the skill and high performance of those men and women under twenty years of age," which agreed with vision the Mr. and Mrs. Purcell shared.

Winning skippers

Other events
The inaugural Wooden Boat Festival was held on June 7, 2014 at the Balboa Yacht Club. The show is similar to the Lake Tahoe Concours d'Elegance with vintage wooden power boats and sailboats.

Maritime Sciences & Seamanship Foundation
The Balboa Yacht Club also funds the BYC Maritime Sciences & Seamanship Foundation

See also
List of International Council of Yacht Clubs members

References

External links
 
 Race Calendar
 BYC Maritime Sciences & Seamanship Foundation

1922 establishments in California
Sailing in Newport Beach, California 
Organizations based in Orange County, California
Yacht clubs in the United States
Organizations established in 1922